Jacopo Massaro (born 12 February 1974 in Florence) is an Italian politician.

Massaro ran as an independent for the office of Mayor of Belluno at the 2012 Italian local elections, supported by a centre-left coalition. He won and took office on 22 May 2012.

He was re-elected for a second term on 27 June 2017.

See also
2012 Italian local elections
2017 Italian local elections
List of mayors of Belluno

References

External links
 

Politicians of Veneto
1974 births
Living people
Mayors of places in Veneto
People from Belluno